John Mortimer Brinkley (born 1763 or 1766died 14 September 1835) was the first Royal Astronomer of Ireland and later Bishop of Cloyne. He was President of the Royal Irish Academy (1822–35), President of the Royal Astronomical Society (1831–33). He was awarded the Cunningham Medal in 1818, and the Copley Medal in 1824.

Early years
Brinkley was born in Woodbridge, Suffolk and was baptised there on 31 January 1763, the illegitimate son of Sarah Brinkley, a butcher's daughter.

On being admitted to Cambridge, he was recorded as being the son of John Toler Brinkley, a vintner, but it is strongly suggested that his real father was John Toler, 1st Earl of Norbury, Chief Justice of the Irish Court of Common Pleas.

His exact date of birth is unknown; he has often been assigned the birth year 1763, as at least one obituary gives his age at death in 1835 as 72. However, his memorial at Trinity College, Dublin states that he died aged 70; also, he was recorded as being 17 upon matriculation at Gonville and Caius College, Cambridge in August 1783, both of which imply a slightly later birth year.

Career

Scientific

He graduated Bachelor of Arts (BA) in 1788 as Senior Wrangler and Smith's Prizeman, was elected a fellow of the college and was awarded Cambridge Master of Arts (MA Cantab) in 1791. He was ordained at Lincoln Cathedral in the same year.

In 1792 he became the second Andrews Professor of Astronomy in the University of Dublin,  which carried the new title of Royal Astronomer of Ireland. He was the director at the Dunsink Observatory from 1790 to 1827. Together with John Law, Bishop of Elphin, he drafted the chapter on "Astronomy" in William Paley's Natural Theology. His main work concerned stellar astronomy and he published his Elements of Plane Astronomy in 1808.

In 1818 he was awarded the prestigious Cunningham Medal of the Royal Irish Academy and in 1822 was elected a Foreign Honorary Member of the American Academy of Arts and Sciences. He was awarded the Copley Medal by the Royal Society in 1824.

Brinkley's observations that several stars shifted their apparent place in the sky in the course of a year were disproved at Greenwich by his contemporary John Pond, the Astronomer Royal. In 1826, he was appointed Bishop of Cloyne in County Cork, a position he held for the remaining nine years of his life. Brinkley was elected President of the Royal Astronomical Society in 1831, serving in that position for two years.

He was also an honorary Fellow of the Royal Society of Edinburgh (HFRSE).

Clerical

On May 24 May 1806 he was appointed a prebendary of Elphin Cathedral; and on 5 June 1806 he became Rector of Derrybrusk. Later that year Trinity College, Dublin awarded him the degree of Doctor of Divinity. He was appointed the Archdeacon of Clogher in 1808; and collated to the Vicarage of Laracor. There is a memorial to him in Cloyne Cathedral.

Family
Brinkley married Esther, daughter of Matthew Weld of Molesworth Street, Sheriff of Dublin City, by his wife Elizabeth Kane, daughter of Nathaniel Kane (d. 1757) of Drumreaske, Co. Monaghan; Sheriff (1720) and Lord Mayor of Dublin (1734); co-founder of the Bank of Kane & Latouche. Brinkley and his wife were the parents of two sons and a daughter: John (1793–1847), Rector of Glanworth, Diocese of Cloyne, who married Anna, second daughter and co-heir of Walter Stephens, of Hybla, co. Kildare; Sarah Jane (1801–1827), second wife of Dr. Robert Graves, who died giving birth to a daughter; and Matthew (1797–1855) J.P., of Parsonstown House, Co. Meath, who married Harriet, a daughter of Richard Graves and with her was the father of Francis Brinkley.

Death
Brinkley died in 1835 at Leeson Street, Dublin and was buried in Trinity College chapel. He was succeeded at Dunsink Observatory by William Rowan Hamilton.

Arms

References

W. W. Rouse Ball, A History of the Study of Mathematics at Cambridge University, 1889, repr. Cambridge University Press, 2009, p. 109

1760s births
1835 deaths
Year of birth uncertain
Directors of Dunsink Observatory
Doctors of Divinity
19th-century British astronomers
Recipients of the Copley Medal
Fellows of the American Academy of Arts and Sciences
Fellows of the Royal Society
People from Woodbridge, Suffolk
Fellows of Gonville and Caius College, Cambridge
Academics of Trinity College Dublin
Anglican bishops of Cloyne
Senior Wranglers
Date of birth unknown
18th-century British astronomers
19th-century Anglican bishops in Ireland
Irish astronomers
Presidents of the Royal Astronomical Society
Archdeacons of Clogher
Presidents of the Royal Irish Academy
People educated at Woodbridge School